Reading station is an MBTA Commuter Rail station in Reading, Massachusetts. It serves the Haverhill/Reading Line. It is located at Lincoln and High Streets on the western fringe of Reading's central business district. The station's historic depot building was built in 1870 by the Boston and Maine Railroad. The station was the terminus of the line from 1959 until the re-extension to Haverhill station in 1979.

Architecture and history

The Boston and Maine Railroad Extension from Wilmington Junction to Boston was completed in 1845, with intermediate stops including Reading. A new station building was constructed in 1870. The depot is located southwest of the tracks, at the junction of Lincoln and Prescott Streets.  It is a long rectangular building with Queen Anne styling, with paneled pilasters at the corners and between the bays, and large knee braces that help support the wide overhangs of the hip roof.  The north (track-facing) facade has seven bays, alternating windows (4) and doors (3).  One of the windows is a projecting bay with a band of narrow and tall windows, whose upper sash has colored lights.

The station was purchased by the town in 1960, and was briefly used as a museum of railroad history. The MBTA purchased the Haverhill Line in 1973, intending to replace commuter rail service with extended Orange Line subway service between Oak Grove and Reading. The new Reading/128 terminus would have been located outside the downtown area just south of Route 128, rather than at the current downtown location. Ultimately, the extension was not built past Oak Grove due to rising costs, and commuter rail service was kept on the corridor. The station building was added to the National Register of Historic Places in 1984. The town sold the building to private owners in 1985, with preservation restrictions.

The station was later rebuilt around 1991 with a mini-high platform on the inbound side for accessibility. The second track, removed decades earlier, was not rebuilt; the outbound platform was repaired, but a second mini-high platform was not built. Thus, the inbound platform serves trains in both directions. In June 2022, the MBTA indicated plans to add a turnback track at the station at a cost of $1.5–2 million. It would be completed in 2023, allowing service between Reading and Boston to operate on 30-minute headways.

See also
National Register of Historic Places listings in Reading, Massachusetts

References

External links

 MBTA - Reading
 Station from Google Maps Street View

Buildings and structures in Reading, Massachusetts
Railway stations in the United States opened in 1870
Stations along Boston and Maine Railroad lines
Railway stations on the National Register of Historic Places in Massachusetts
MBTA Commuter Rail stations in Middlesex County, Massachusetts
National Register of Historic Places in Reading, Massachusetts